The African American Heritage Trail of Westchester County
in New York was created in 2004 to help preserve and interpret the historic landmark places that help tell the narratives of women and men of African descent who have made significant contributions to an American identity. The initial list had 13 sites. Westchester County historian and Schulman History Honoree Dr. Larry Spruill was lead consultant and researcher for the project.

History
As early as 1984, leaders of Westchester's African American community under the guidance of John Harmon began building awareness about important heritage sites in the county. A more formalized trail was later created under the auspices of the African American Advisory Board of Westchester County (AAAB) currently chaired by Barbara Edwards. Associated AAAB events like the annual Trailblazer Awards each February and other programs and exhibits are regularly hosted at several of the 16 sites.

Sites
The trail includes 16 heritage destination sites as of 2023:
 
  Saint Paul's Church National Historic Site – 897 South Columbus Avenue, Mount Vernon, New York. This landmark, managed by the National Park Service, is the site of thousands of burials of African American men and women. Programs conducted here reflect the contributions of enslaved and free families to the surrounding community along Eastchester Creek. Church records include notations which are helpful for genealogical research purposes.

  Jay Estate – 210 Boston Post Road, Rye, New York. The ancestral home of John Jay and the Jay family was also the residence of enslaved and freed men and women of African descent. Programs and school tours focus on the abolition of slavery in New York and Civil Rights as well as John Jay's anti-slavery efforts including work with the NY Manumission Society and passage of Gradual Emancipation Act of New York while Governor. Educational programs and exhibits interpret the lives of enslaved men and women who lived and worked at "The Locusts" including Caesar Valentine, Mary and Clarinda; several are buried in unmarked graves on the original property. The 23-acre park is operated by the non-profit Jay Heritage Center.
  John Jay Homestead – Katonah, New York. This is the retirement home of John Jay. The site is owned by New York State Parks.

  The Rye African-American Cemetery – 215 North Street, Rye, New York. There are at least 300 known burials at this 1860 National Historic Register including African American veterans of the Civil War. It is maintained by the non-profit Friends of the Rye African American Cemetery. Associated programs and a large 3 paneled kiosk trace the lives of free 19th and 20th century individuals of African descent who lived and worked in the Town of Rye, Mamaroneck and Scarsdale including Charles and Harriett Seely Purdy, the Brown Family, the Petersen family and their descendants. The site hosts annual observations at Memorial Day and Veterans Day. It was added to the National Historic Register in 1986.

  Foster Memorial AME Zion Church – Tarrytown, New York; this church was a refuge for fugitive slaves.

  Stony Hill Cemetery – Buckout Road, Harrison, New York. This 18th century burial ground is noted for over 200 burials of free black residents from an area called "The Hills" of Harrison including a dozen African American veterans of the Civil War. The land was originally donated by the Quaker Church to enslaved people who had been freed. The property is associated with Mount Hope African American Zion Church.

  Philipsburg Manor – Sleepy Hollow, New York. Over 23 men and women are known to have been enslaved at the manor by the Philipse family. The site hosts programs that illustrates the humanity of these individuals who were treated like property. The venue is owned and operated by Historic Hudson Valley.

  Philipse Manor Hall State Historic Site – Yonkers, New York.

  Monument to 1st Rhode Island Regiment – 2880 Crompound Road, Yorktown Heights, New York. This monument is dedicated to soldiers of the First Rhode Island Regiment who died in the Battle of Pine's Bridge during the Revolutionary War. Many were enslaved African Americans. This stone was erected in 1982 thanks to the civic advocacy of historian John H. Harmon. It is located in front of the First Presbyterian Church of Yorktown Heights.

  Ella Fitzgerald Statue – 5 Buena Vista Avenue, Yonkers, New York; Ella Fitzgerald, a renowned jazz singer, grew up in Westchester. This statue commemorating her contributions to American music was created by African American artist Vinnie Bagwell.

  Friends Meeting House – 420 Quaker Road, Chappaqua, New York

  Jack Peterson Memorial – Croton, New York, named for Revolutionary war patriot John Jacob "Rifle Jack" Peterson. Peterson's act of heroism was declared a pivotal moment that led to the capture of Major Andre.

  Villa Lewaro – Irvington, New York; historic residence of African American businesswoman and cosmetics pioneer Madame C. J. Walker; privately owned, not open to the public. Historian Brent Leggs helped research possible preservation opportunities for the property.

 Neuberger Museum of Art – This museum which has a large collection of African diaspora art was first added to the trail in 2017.

References

Historic trails and roads in New York (state)
Cultural heritage of the United States
Tourist attractions in Westchester County, New York
African-American history of Westchester County, New York
Heritage trails

External links
 Saint Paul's Church National Historic Site website
 Jay Estate website
 Neuberger Museum of Art website